Mikhak (also Romanized as Mīkhak; also known as Mīkh-e Khar) is a village in Qaleh Hamam Rural District, Salehabad County, Razavi Khorasan Province, Iran. At the 2006 census, its population was 385, in 70 families.

References 

Populated places in   Torbat-e Jam County